Henry Durant (June 18, 1802 in Acton, Massachusetts – January 22, 1875 in Oakland, California) was the founding president of the University of California.

Biography
Durant attended Phillips Academy and the Andover Theological Seminary in Andover, Massachusetts; he then studied for the ministry at Yale College, from which he graduated in 1827. In 1833 he was ordained pastor of the Congregational church of Byfield, Massachusetts. In the same year, he married Mary E. Buffett of Stanwich, Connecticut.

Career 
After serving in the ministry for 16 years, he resigned his pastorate and became headmaster of the Dummer Academy (today known as The Governor's Academy) in Byfield. He held that position from 1849 to 1852.

In 1853, Durant came to California and founded the Contra Costa Academy, as a private school for boys. In 1855, the school was chartered as the College of California.

The college later disincorporated and merged with the state of California's Agricultural, Mining, and Mechanical Arts College to create the University of California in 1868. Durant was elected the first president of the University of California on August 16, 1870, and resigned only two years later in order to relinquish the position to a younger man (Daniel Coit Gilman). In 1873, the University of California moved to its new Berkeley campus.

Old age did not keep Durant from being elected the 16th mayor of Oakland, although he only served for three years before dying in office, on January 22, 1875.

See also
Hotel Durant

References
Biography at UC Berkeley

1802 births
1875 deaths
Phillips Academy alumni
Leaders of the University of California, Berkeley
Yale Divinity School alumni
University of California regents
University of California, Berkeley
Mayors of Oakland, California
People from Acton, Massachusetts
19th-century American politicians
Yale College alumni